Kapil Yadav (born 17 March 1987) is an Indian former cricketer. He played two first-class matches for Delhi between 2008 and 2010.

See also
 List of Delhi cricketers

References

External links
 

1987 births
Living people
Indian cricketers
Delhi cricketers
Cricketers from Delhi